Jeff Liberty (born 5 February 1978) is a Canadian diver. He competed in the men's 3 metre springboard event at the 2000 Summer Olympics.

References

External links
 

1978 births
Living people
Canadian male divers
Olympic divers of Canada
Divers at the 2000 Summer Olympics
Sportspeople from North Bay, Ontario